In My Lifetime, Vol. 1 is the second studio album by American rapper Jay-Z. It was released on November 4, 1997, by Roc-A-Fella Records and Def Jam Recordings. The album debuted at number three on the US Billboard 200 chart and was certified Platinum by the RIAA, selling over 138,000 copies in its first week of release. In My Lifetime, Vol. 1 also served as Jay-Z's first album release following the sudden death of fellow Brooklyn rapper and collaborator The Notorious B.I.G. in March 1997.

Production 
The album features guest contributions by Lil' Kim, Foxy Brown, Babyface, Blackstreet, Teddy Riley, Too $hort, Sauce Money and Puff Daddy. Producers for Reasonable Doubt such as DJ Premier and Ski contribute to a limited number of beats on this album, though the majority of the production is handled by Puff Daddy's production team The Hitmen from the Bad Boy label, giving the album a generally glossier sound than its predecessor.  It displayed a shift from the mafioso rap themes of Reasonable Doubt to the so-called "jiggy" era of late 90s hip-hop, often credited to videos and albums from Puff Daddy and his Bad Boy record label's roster of artists including Notorious B.I.G. (the first two singles from his second album were both huge pop hits) and Mase. "Reasonable Doubt was like an introduction," Jay-Z told MTV News. "Like, you know, meeting somebody out on the street... Everything, your whole conversation is very general, not too much detail and things like that. Its just that 'In My Lifetime' is more detailed, more in-depth. Much more personal".

Influence of Biggie Smalls 
In a 1998 interview with MTV News, Jay-Z explained how the death of fellow Brooklyn rapper and collaborator The Notorious B.I.G. shaped parts of In My Lifetime, Vol. 1. In the interview, he explained how the album was not as fun to record as his debut, Reasonable Doubt (1996), and that certain tracks, such as "The City is Mine", were influenced by the rapper's death.

Critical reception 

In a contemporary review, Steve Jones of USA Today called In My Lifetime "a rock-solid set with both street and pop appeal". Chicago Tribune critic Soren Baker believed Jay-Z's lyrics "contain a finesse and insight few can articulate as succinctly", while writing that "his use of pop producers Teddy Riley and Sean 'Puffy' Combs will alienate listeners, even as Jay-Z establishes himself as that rare underground rhymer with commercial appeal". Robert Christgau gave the album a two-star honorable mention in his 2000 Consumer Guide book, indicating a "likable effort consumers attuned to its overriding aesthetic or individual vision may well enjoy". He named "(Always Be My) Sunshine" and "Real Niggaz" as highlights while calling Jay-Z "arrogant yet diffident, ruthless yet cute—a scary original". Chris Norris of Spin said Jay-Z's raps are often "in search of meaty ideas or distinctive charm—skills without pleasure", and was also critical of the production. "Without one sure, guiding vision," Norris wrote, "the Combs blueprint comes off as either mundane or embarrassing".

AllMusic editor John Bush wrote in a retrospective review, "Though the productions are just a bit flashier and more commercial than on his debut, Jay-Z remained the tough street rapper, and even improved a bit on his flow". According to Bush, he "struts the line between project poet and up-and-coming player" while balancing "both personas with the best rapping heard in the rap game since the deaths of 2Pac and Notorious B.I.G.".

Track listing

Charts

Weekly charts

Year-end charts

Singles

Certifications

References

External links 
 In My Lifetime, Vol. 1 at Discogs
 Album Review at RapReviews

Jay-Z albums
1997 albums
Albums produced by Buckwild
Albums produced by Chad Hugo
Albums produced by Sean Combs
Albums produced by Teddy Riley
Albums produced by DJ Premier
Albums produced by Ski Beatz
Albums produced by Trackmasters
Albums produced by Jaz-O
Def Jam Recordings albums
Roc-A-Fella Records albums